Kate Hermann (1903/4–2007) was the first female neurology consultant in Scotland. Hermann, who was Jewish, left with her family from Hamburg to London in 1937, fleeing the Nazis. She then moved, in 1938, to Edinburgh to study at the Royal Infirmary under Professor Norman Dott. She retired from medicine in 1970.

Works 
 Hermann, Kate; Macgregor, Agnes R. (1940-03-30). "Cerebral Haemorrhage from Rupture of Congenital Intracerebral Aneurysm in a Child". British Medical Journal. 1 (4134): 523–538.3. . .
 Hermann, Kate (2017-02-24). "Pituitary Exophthalmos". The British Journal of Ophthalmology. 36 (1): 1–19. . .

References 

1900s births
2007 deaths
British neurologists
Jewish emigrants from Nazi Germany to the United Kingdom